Exodus is the sixteenth studio album by American singer Brian McKnight. It was released by The SoNo Recording Group on June 26, 2020 in the United States. According to McKnight, the album will mark his final project release of all original material. The singer worked with Earl Cohen, Tim Kelley, Chris Paultre, and Claude Villani on Exodus which was preceded by the singles "42 (Grown Up Tipsy)", "When I'm Gone", and "Neva Get Enuf of U." The album debuted and peaked at number 86 on the US Billboard Current Album Sales.

Critical reception

SoulTracks editor Justin Kantor found that"Exodus, by and large, hardly comes close to living up to its title in substance and style. With a few notable exceptions, a large portion of the content goes through the motions—along with McKnight, whose abilities are such that some sub-par moments come across as at least passable. Hopefully, devotees will take the time to dig deep enough to unearth the scattering of special points where he puts that extra care into the compositions and comes up with fittingly convincing performances."

Track listing

Charts

References

2020 albums
Brian McKnight albums